Philip B. Healey (August 21, 1921 – May 27, 1996) was an American politician from New York.

Life
He was born on August 21, 1921, in Brooklyn, New York City. He served in the U.S. Air Force. He graduated B.B.A. from St. John's University in 1951. In 1953, he married Geneva Musalo, and they had three children. They lived in Massapequa, Nassau County, New York. He graduated M.B.A. from LIU Post in 1968.

He entered politics as a Republican, and was a member of the Oyster Bay Town Board. He was a member of the  New York State Assembly from 1971 until his death in 1996, sitting in the 179th, 180th, 181st, 182nd, 183rd, 184th, 185th, 186th, 187th, 188th, 189th, 190th and 191st New York State Legislatures.

He died on May 27, 1996, at the Massapequa General Hospital, of a heart attack.

The Philip B. Healey Beach at Florence Avenue, Massapequa, was named in his honor. The Bethpage State Parkway was named Philip B. Healey Memorial Parkway in his honor.

References

1921 births
1996 deaths
People from Massapequa, New York
Republican Party members of the New York State Assembly
St. John's University (New York City) alumni
Long Island University alumni
20th-century American politicians